The following is a list of traditional Naga games and sports.

Games
 Terhüchü, a two-player abstract strategy board game.

Sports
 Aki Kiti, a semi-contact combat sport characterized by kicking and blocking solely using the soles of the feet.
 Kene, a folk wrestling style and traditional sport of the Nagas.
 Pcheda, a sport that requires players to throw thin bamboo sticks from a set distance.

See also
 Naga people

Naga games
Traditional games